The Seventh Sign is the seventh studio album by Swedish guitarist Yngwie Malmsteen, released on 9 May 1994.

Reception and legacy

The Seventh Sign reached No. 11 on the Swedish albums chart and No. 47 on the Swiss albums chart, both in 1994. In July 2014, Guitar World magazine placed the album at No. 46 on their "Superunknown: 50 Iconic Albums That Defined 1994" list.

Steve Huey at AllMusic gave The Seventh Sign three stars out of five, saying that Malmsteen's extensive use of a wah pedal in the style of Jimi Hendrix makes the album "necessary for Malmsteen fans, even though his more neo-classical work (solos, instrumentals, etc.) seems less inspired here." He also heavily criticised the power ballad "Prisoner of Your Love", calling it "downright embarrassing."

Track listing

Personnel
Yngwie Malmsteen – vocals ("Angel in Heat"), guitar, bass, sitar, producer
Michael Vescera – vocals
Mats Olausson – keyboard, Hammond organ
Mike Terrana – drums, triangle
Jim Thomas – engineering
Jeff Glixman – engineering
Mike Fraser – mixing
Keith Rose – mixing assistance

Release history

Chart performance

Certifications

References

External links
The Seventh Sign, 1994 at yngwiemalmsteen.com
In Review: Yngwie J. Malmsteen "The Seventh Sign" at Guitar Nine Records

Yngwie Malmsteen albums
1994 albums
Music for Nations albums
Pony Canyon albums
SPV/Steamhammer albums